Batocera browni is a species of beetle in the family Cerambycidae. It was described by Bates in 1877. The species is known from Australia, and is extremely rare.

References

Batocerini
Beetles described in 1877